MNC World News was an international news TV channel 24 hours in English. MNC World News can be watched via the channel 85. MNC Media MNC Vision in World News is the first English-language television channel in the Channels MNC Media MNC Vision. For now, MNC World News can only be captured in a subscription television network belonging to MNC Media like MNC Vision, and MNC Play Media. In the future targeted MNC World News channel will be available in a variety of satellite and cable television worldwide in 2020 but the target was not reached.

Programmes 
 World Hour
 World Hour Weekend
 Daybreak
 Screenshot
 The Marketplace
 Glimpse from the Past
 Top 5 Current Issues
 Showbiz Central
 Raising the Bar
 Special Dialogue

Presenters 
 Tommy Tjokro (previously on MetroTV and Bloomberg TV Indonesia, is also working as an announcer for RCTI)
 Juanita Wiratmadja (previously on SCTV, Kompas TV and VOA Indonesia, then to CNBC Indonesia, now not working on any television network)
 Roberlin Purba (previously on MetroTV)
 Krishna Sam
 Togi Sinaga (also on MNC News)
 Karina Tasya
 Irsan Karim (now on CNN Indonesia)
 Dirza Prakoso (previously on MNC News, now on SEA Today)
 Amelia Yachya (previously on Global TV and MNC News, then to CNN Indonesia, now on tvOne)
 Nicole Shiraz (previously on Fox Sports Australia, iNews TV and MNC Sports)
 Emelli Putri (previously on MNC News)

MNC World News Network 
Broadcast MNC World News can be seen on MNC Vision, and MNC Play Media.

References

External links 
 Situs resmi MNC Channels

Television news in Indonesia